Bardos may refer to:
 the six bardos of Tibetan Buddhism
 Bardos, Pyrénées-Atlantiques, a commune in France
 Lajos Bárdos, composer and conductor
 Bardoș River, a river in Romania

See also 
 Bardo (disambiguation)